Adam Morawski (born 17 October 1994) is a Polish handball goalkeeper for Wisła Płock and the Polish national handball team.

He participated at the 2017 World Men's Handball Championship.

References

External links

1994 births
Living people
Polish male handball players
Wisła Płock (handball) players
People from Ciechanów